Labor of Love is a studio album by American country artist Janie Frickie. It was released in July 1989 via Columbia Records and included ten tracks. The disc was the fourteenth studio release of Frickie's career. It was also her final album for the Columbia label before she was dropped by the company. Two singles were spawned from Labor of Love that made charting positions on both the American and Canadian country surveys.

Background and content
Janie Frickie had a string of top ten and number one country singles during the mid-1980s that helped consider her as one of the genre's most successful female artists of the decade. By the end of 1980s, Frickie's singles had reached progressively lower chart positions and she was eventually dropped by her long time label Columbia Records. Before the end of her contract, Frickie recorded one last album titled Labor of Love. The project was recorded in February 1989 at the Nightingale Studio, located in Nashville, Tennessee. It was produced by Chris Waters and was her first project to be produced by him. 

Labor of Love contained ten tracks and was mostly a collection of ballads. Its opening track "Love Is One of Those Words" was co-written by Waters, along with country performer Holly Dunn. Also featured was Frickie's self-composed "Last Thing I Didn't Do", which she co-wrote with husband Randy Jackson. "My Old Friend the Blues" was written and originally recorded by Steve Earle for his album Guitar Town. The album also included "One of Those Things", which would later be recorded and become a top ten country single for its writer Pam Tillis.

Release, reception and singles

Labor of Love was originally released in July 1989 on Columbia Records. It was the fourteenth studio disc of Frickie's career. The album was originally issued as a vinyl LP, cassette and compact disc. Years later, it was reissued to digital platforms including Apple Music. The album spent 13 weeks on America's Billboard country albums chart in 1989, peaking at number 64. To date, it is Frickie's last album to reach a Billboard chart position. Due to constant mispronunciations of her last name, Columbia changed the spelling from "Fricke" to "Frickie" beginning in 1986. Jason Ankeny of AllMusic only rated the album 2.5 out of 5 stars in his review.

Labor of Love spawned two singles. Its first single was "Love Is One of Those Words", which was released by Columbia in April 1989. It spent seven weeks on the Billboard Hot Country Songs chart and peaked at number 56 in June 1989. The record's second single was "Give 'em My Number", which was distributed by Columbia in August 1989. The single spent nine weeks on the Billboard country and reached number 43 in October 1989. "Give 'em My Number" is Frickie's last Billboard charting single to date. They also made the Canadian RPM country songs chart, both reaching positions outside the top 40 as well.

Track listings

Vinyl and cassette versions

Compact disc and digital versions

Personnel
All credits are adapted from the liner notes of Labor of Love.

Musical personnel
 Janie Frickie - lead and backing vocals
 Mark Casstevens – acoustic guitar
 Steve Earle – acoustic guitar
 Paul Franklin – Dobro, steel guitar
 Billy Hullett – acoustic guitar
 Roy Huskey, Jr. – electric upright bass
 John Jarvis – piano
 Chris Leuzinger – acoustic guitar, electric guitar
 Larrie Londin – drums
 Phil Naish – keyboards, piano

 Al Perkins – steel guitar
 Judy Rodman – backing vocals
 Tom Robb – electric bass
 Gary Smith – piano
 Pam Tillis – backing vocals
 Tony Wiggins – backing vocals
 Dennis Wilson – backing vocals
 Lonnie Wilson – drums
 Chris Waters – backing vocals
 Glenn Worf – electric bass
 Curtis Young – backing vocals

Technical personnel
 Lee Groitzsch – additional engineering
 Bill Johnson – art direction
 Shawn McLean – assistant engineer
 McGuire – photography
 Gary Paczosa – assistant engineer
 Michael Psanos – engineer, remix engineer
 Carry Summers – assistant engineer
 Chris Waters – arranger, producer 
 Hank Williams – mastering engineer

Charts

Release history

References

1988 albums
Janie Fricke albums
Columbia Records albums